Angostura is a genus of medicinal plant native to South America. Its bark is sometimes used in bitters.

Species
It includes the following species (this list may be incomplete):
Angostura alipes
Angostura trifoliata

References

 
Zanthoxyloideae genera